This is a list of shopping malls/shopping centres in Dubai, United Arab Emirates.

Completed malls

Malls under construction

In popular culture
In September 2011, a music video about the Malls of Dubai by a Dubai resident Rohit Iyengar went viral on the video sharing site YouTube.

Image gallery

See also

List of buildings in Dubai
List of shopping malls in the United Arab Emirates
Mall of the Emirates

References

External links
List of shopping malls in Dubai
Major shopping malls in Dubai
Online Shopping destinations in Dubai
Dubai has 65 Shopping Malls - Businessinsider

Shopping malls established in 2008
Shopping malls in Dubai
Dubai
shopping malls
Shopping malls, Dubai